Gagauz or Gagauzian may refer to:

 The Gagauz people, an ethnic group living in Moldova and Ukraine
 Gagauz people in Moldova
 Gagauz people in Ukraine
 Gagauz language, a Turkic language spoken by the Gagauz people
 Gagauzia, homeland of the Gagauz people and autonomous division in Moldova

Language and nationality disambiguation pages